Chambet is a surname. Notable people with the surname include:

 Charles-Joseph Chambet (1792–1867), French bookseller, essayist, bibliophile and playwright
 Ludivine Chambet (born 1983), French serial killer

French-language surnames